Richwood is an unincorporated community in Becker County, Minnesota, United States. Richwood has a post office with ZIP code 56577.

References

Unincorporated communities in Becker County, Minnesota
Unincorporated communities in Minnesota